Govt. Higher Secondary Institute Botingoo is an educational institution located in Botingoo Sopore in the Baramulla District of Jammu and Kashmir, India and is one of the institutes in Jammu and Kashmir providing secondary education to the students of ambient areas as Watlab, Magraypora, Hathlangoo, Janwara, Mundji, Botingoo, Rampora and Rajpora. The institute is located in the village of Botingoo and has various infrastructural facilities. The institute has well equipped computer lab with Internet facility.  The school publishes an annual school magazine Al-Noor in which all the students as well as teachers share their own views. It also provides opportunities to its students to participate in various inter-district and inter-state tournaments. The students of the institute have won trophies and medals in different tournaments.

See also 
Government Degree College Sopore

References 

Baramulla district
High schools and secondary schools in Jammu and Kashmir
Sopore